Sardar Wahid Bakhsh Bhayo (Urdu:و١حد بخش) (born Wahid Bakhsh Bhayo; 15 October 1954, died 13 December 2018) was a Pakistani politician. He was a member of the Central Executive Committee of the Pakistan Peoples Party and a former member of the Provincial Assembly of Sindh and he was the tribal head of the Bhayo Tribe.

References

1954 births
2018 deaths
Pakistan People's Party politicians
Sindh National Front politicians